Ronald L. Green (born  1964) is a United States Marine who served as the 18th Sergeant Major of the Marine Corps. He succeeded Micheal Barrett on February 20, 2015, and relinquished the post to Troy E. Black on July 26, 2019. As the Sergeant Major of the Marine Corps, Green was the highest ranking non-commissioned officer in the United States Marine Corps. Green retired during the summer of 2019.

Early life and education
Born in Jackson, Mississippi, Green enlisted and began recruit training at Marine Corps Recruit Depot Parris Island, South Carolina, on 27 November 1983. Green holds a Bachelor of Science in Cybersecurity and a Master of Science in Cybersecurity Policy from the University of Maryland University College.

Military career
Green has been meritoriously promoted to the ranks of private first class, lance corporal, corporal, sergeant, and staff sergeant.

Throughout his career, Green has been assigned numerous duties to include: field artillery cannoneer; field artillery nuclear projectileman; tower operator; drill instructor, senior drill instructor and drill master; battery section chief and battery gunnery sergeant, Assistant Marine Officer Instructor at Southern University and A&M College; first sergeant of Inspector-Instructor Staff, B Company, 1st Battalion, 23rd Marine Regiment; and sergeant major of Headquarters Marine Corps Henderson Hall, United States Marine Corps Forces, Europe/Marine Corps Forces Africa and 1st Marine Expeditionary Force.

Green has deployed to Somalia with the 13th Marine Expeditionary Unit (Special Operations Capable) during Operation Restore Hope in 1993; to South America in support of Operation United Americas (UNITAS) in 2002; and with Marine Light Attack Helicopter Squadron 169 in support of the Iraq War's Operation Iraqi Freedom in 2006.

Awards and decorations
 

Green has earned 8 service stripes.

Further reading

References

External links

1964 births
United States Marine Corps personnel of the Iraq War
Living people
People from Jackson, Mississippi
Recipients of the Navy Distinguished Service Medal
Recipients of the Legion of Merit
Sergeants Major of the Marine Corps
African-American United States Navy personnel